Bianca Ryan's discography consists of one studio album, two extended plays, seven singles and six music videos. Her debut album Bianca Ryan was released on 14 November 2006 by Syco Music. It was followed by two holiday EPs, Christmas Everyday! (2006) and True Meaning of Christmas (2009). The latter was released by recording label Music Forever. In August 2010, she recorded a single inspired by the film The Twilight Saga: New Moon titled "In My Head". Between 2014 and 2015 she released three more singles: a cover of John Legend's "All of Me", "Broken Down House" and "Alice".

Debut album Bianca Ryan sold over 200,000 copies worldwide and peaked number 34 in Ireland. The single "Why Couldn't It Be Christmas Every Day?" entered the Dutch charts. Ryan was signed to Syco/Columbia Records between 2006 and 2008 and then the indie labels Music Forever and Turned in Music before forming her label in 2015.

Albums

Studio albums

Compilation albums
 Bianca Ryan / Christmas Everyday! (2006)

Extended plays

Singles

Music videos

References

Discographies of American artists
Rhythm and blues discographies
Bianca Ryan songs